Back in Baroque: The String Tribute to AC/DC is a classical version of the album Back in Black by hard rock band AC/DC. It replaces the vocals and guitars of the original songs with an array of stringed instruments.

Track listing
 Hells Bells
 Shoot to Thrill
 What Do You Do for Money Honey
 Give the Dog a Bone
 Let Me Put My Love into You
 Back in Black
 You Shook Me All Night Long
 Have a Drink on Me
 Shake a Leg
 Rock & Roll Ain't Noise Pollution

Reception

References

Vitamin String Quartet albums
2003 compilation albums
AC/DC tribute albums
Vitamin Records compilation albums